Don Bosco Catholic Secondary School  (also called Don Bosco, Don Bosco CSS, DBCSS, Don Bosco Toronto, or simply Bosco), is a Toronto Catholic District School Board secondary school facility in the city of Toronto, Ontario, Canada. It is located in the former suburb of Etobicoke, north of the intersection of Islington Avenue and Dixon Road in the Kingsview Village neighbourhood.

The school opened in 1978 by the Salesians of Don Bosco religious orders as Central Etobicoke's first Catholic high school and moved into the former Keiller Mackay Collegiate Institute building, constructed and opened in 1971 by the Etobicoke Board of Education, in 1983. Don Bosco became fully publicly funded by  the Metropolitan Separate School Board in 1987. Many years later, the board closed Don Bosco due to dwindling enrollment in 2017 and the building became the temporary home for the Toronto Argonauts practice facility, with a short-term lease of the facility from the TCDSB. After its vacancy, the school building is used to house Dante Alighieri Academy starting in 2021–22 school year as their school is being reconstructed.

In the school's later years, Don Bosco became famous for then-Mayor Rob Ford's notorious football program.

History 
The school was named after Saint John Bosco since 1978. During the 2000s up to 2013, the school was known for having former Toronto mayor Rob Ford as its school coach. In 2014, Don Bosco adopted a Self-Directed Learning program, similar to that of Mary Ward Catholic Secondary School in Scarborough, becoming only the second such school in the GTA and third in Ontario to do so. The school subsequently disbanded this method and returned to the regular class system.

Sports
In the school's inaugural year, it took the midget girl's relay title in a competition.

Football program
The head coach of the school's football program, from 2002 to 2013, was Rob Ford, (affectionately known as "The F-150" by the school), the Mayor of Toronto from 2010 until 2014. Ford had previously been a coach at Newtonbrook Secondary School, until a 2001 confrontation with a student. The Canadian Taxpayers Federation lodged criticism against Ford for using city resources for the program. Two of Ford's summer football teams list two of Ford's city-paid special assistants as contacts, providing the numbers for their city-owned cellphones. Sources claimed Ford used a city car to ferry players to games and practices. Ford skipped 5 1/2 hours of a City executive committee meeting to attend a "pre-season jamboree" with his team, not telling his council allies.

Ford talked to Sun News Network about the program, how many students "come from gangs" and "broken homes", and without football would have "no reason to go to school". Some Don Bosco school staff sent an anonymous group letter to senior Catholic school board officials, decrying Ford's comments about the school to Sun News, calling them "no reflection of the real" school. The board launched an investigation about the comments. At a parent meeting, some attendees expressed concern that the school is too often called "Rob Ford's". In May 2013, the Toronto Star saw video of Ford calling the students "just f---ing minorities"; the school board refused to comment, having not seen the video. On May 22, the Toronto Catholic District School Board dismissed Ford from the coaching position. 

One-time player Anthony Smith was murdered March 28, 2013. A photo of Smith with Ford was widely used as illustration during reportage of the alleged drug video. In June 2013, police conducted raids as part of Project Traveller; murder charges in this case are expected. Later, Toronto Police Chief Bill Blair confirmed the existence of the video on October 31, 2013.

See also
List of high schools in Ontario

References

External links
Don Bosco Catholic Secondary School
TCDSB Portal

Toronto Catholic District School Board
High schools in Toronto
Catholic secondary schools in Ontario
Salesian schools
Educational institutions established in 1978
1978 establishments in Ontario
Relocated schools
Education in Etobicoke
Educational institutions disestablished in 2017
2017 disestablishments in Ontario
Toronto Argonauts
Defunct secondary schools
Defunct schools in Canada